Louis Picquot (1804 – 1870) was a 19th-century French musicographer, author of the first biography of Luigi Boccherini and a catalogue of Boccherini's works.

Notice 

Although Picquot had a job far from music - he was a tax collector in Bar-le-Duc - his work reached a general recognition among musicologists, musicians, music historians, publishers etc. In his patient compilation effort, Picquot contacted all those who may have information and documents about the composer, particularly François de Fossa (who played the Quintets with guitar), or the son, Josef Mariano and grandson Fernando, as well as his widow.

The 135-page book, published in 1851, was printed "at Philips, a publisher of music," with a long title, as was customary at the time, but at the same time modest, for he opted for the word "Notice" to describe it. For decades, Picquot's work was the core of Boccherinian studies, since it was far superior to the content of the Biographie universelle by Fétis. The book was reprinted only in 1930, by Georges de Saint-Foix (and a translation, in Spanish, with three context studies, in 2005). Georges de Saint-Foix, a musicologist, added a 45-page introduction, where he corrected many errors and added new data collected by other researchers or by himself.

Today, Picquot is still an important Boccherinian source, on condition of being aware of the inevitable gaps and errors and also of some blurred opinions. While studies of the musician have increased considerably, Picquot has "always a symbolic meaning". Yves Gérard thus comments on the book of Picquot in his catalog of works of Boccherini in 1969:

Works 
1851:

Bibliography 
 
 
  
  Rudolf Rasch, A Note on Louis Picquot (1804-1870), Boccherini's First Biographer, in

References

External links 

1804 births
1870 deaths
French biographers
19th-century French musicologists
Writers about music
19th-century musicologists